U68 may refer to:

German submarine U-68, multiple German submarines
WFUT-DT, a television station licensed to Newark, New Jersey which called itself "U68" circa 1985 when it ran music videos as WWHT